Tanya Walker may refer to:

Tanya Walker (Canadian lawyer)
Tanya Walker, character from Knight Rider played by Phyllis Davis